Highway A-7, Gilmore to Turrell is an old alignment of U.S. Route 63 (US 63) in Crittenden County, Arkansas. Uniquely for practices of the time, this section of concrete roadway consists of a continuous pour, instead of the more typical practice of pouring the roadway in sections. The road section includes a c. 1922 bridge, also made with reinforced concrete. US 63 was realigned off this segment in 1952, which is now known as Front Street in Gilmore and Eureka Street in Turrell.

The roadway segment was listed on the National Register of Historic Places in 2009.

See also
 
 
 National Register of Historic Places listings in Crittenden County, Arkansas

References

Roads on the National Register of Historic Places in Arkansas
Buildings and structures completed in 1922
Transportation in Crittenden County, Arkansas
U.S. Route 63
National Register of Historic Places in Crittenden County, Arkansas